Chakodi, also known as chagodi, is a hot and crunchy Indian snack. It is made with rice flour and is round in shape.

Ingredients
Chakodi are made from rice flour and chilli powder.

References

Indian snack foods